Mordellistenula longipalpis is a beetle in the genus Mordellistenula of the family Mordellidae. It was described in 1965 by Ermisch.

References

Mordellidae
Beetles described in 1965